Dead Fish is a 2008 English-language German action comedy film starring Robert Carlyle, Gary Oldman, Andrew-Lee Potts and Elena Anaya.

Plot
Lynch (Gary Oldman), an emotionless bon-vivant hitman, stops a thief who stole a cell phone from Mimi (Elena Anaya) in a train station. Falling for her at first sight, he does not notice when she accidentally switches cell phones with him. She later gives Lynch's phone to her boyfriend, Abe Klein (Andrew-Lee Potts) who works as a locksmith. When Lynch's employers try to assign Lynch another assassination over the phone, Abe and his pot-smoking slacker artist friend go to warn the victim, Mr. Fish (Terence Stamp), hoping for a reward. Concerned by Abe's behavior over the phone, the employer has another operative, Virgil (Billy Zane), who does not know Lynch by sight, check up on him. The operative has a Czech killer, Dragan (Karel Roden), brought in to deal with "Lynch". All the while, Danny Devine (Robert Carlyle), a foul-tempered, foul-mouthed loan shark, is driving around trying to collect from various deadbeat clients including Abe.

Cast
 Robert Carlyle as Danny Devine
 Cassandra Bell as "Sugar" Waters
 Gary Oldman as Lynch
 John Pearson as Deck Day
 Kevin McNally as Frank Rosenheim
 Elena Anaya as Mimi
 Andrew Lee Potts as Abe Klein
 Billy Zane as Virgil
 Karel Roden as Dragan
 Terence Stamp as Mr. Fish

References

External links
 
 
 Dead Fish at Hollywood.com

2008 films
English-language German films
2000s action comedy films
2000s crime comedy films
British action comedy films
British crime comedy films
Films about kidnapping
Films about contract killing
Films about mobile phones
2008 comedy films
2000s English-language films
2000s British films